Middelburg Dam is a dam located on the Klein Olifants River, part of the Olifants River basin. It is located near Middelburg, Mpumalanga, South Africa. Construction was completed in 1978, at a cost of €54.2 million. The cost was partially subsided by the French and German Governments, at a cost of €20.5 million, whilst also using a donation from the European Stability Mechanism, valued at €10 million. The primary purpose of the dam is to serve for water supply and its hazard potential has been ranked high (3).

See also
List of reservoirs and dams in South Africa
List of rivers of South Africa

References 

Olifants River (Limpopo)
Dams in South Africa
Dams completed in 1978